Folketing elections were held in Denmark on 24 May 1881. Liberals retained their majority, whilst voter turnout was around 47.8%.

Results

References

Denmark
1881 05
1881 in Denmark
Denmark